Blanche Hillyard defeated Maud Shackle 6–1, 6–4 in the All Comers' Final, but the reigning champion Lottie Dod defeated Bingley Hillyard 6-1, 6-1 in the challenge round to win the ladies' singles tennis title at the 1892 Wimbledon Championships.

Draw

Challenge round

All Comers'

References

External links

Ladies' Singles
Wimbledon Championship by year – Women's singles
Wimbledon Championships - Singles
Wimbledon Championships - Singles